Eleanor Hunt (January 10, 1910 – June 12, 1981) was an American film actress.  She starred opposite John Wayne in the 1934 Blue Steel.

Personal life
She was married to actor Rex Lease for "a few months" before their September 1931 divorce and to Dr. Frank G. Nolan from November 1933 until June 14, 1935. She later married George Hirliman, with whom she adopted a daughter,
Georgelle, as an infant.

Filmography

References

External links

1910 births
1981 deaths
American film actresses
Actresses from New York City
20th-century American actresses
Western (genre) film actresses